Oklahoma State Cowboys   

 Central Oklahoma Bronchos 
  

Muhammed Lawal (born January 11, 1981), also known as "King Mo", is an American professional wrestler and retired mixed martial artist currently signed to Major League Wrestling. As a mixed martial artist, he is a former Strikeforce Light Heavyweight Champion and Rizin Heavyweight Grand Prix Champion.

Early life
Lawal was raised along with his siblings by a single Muslim mother. Growing up Lawal was a fan of professional wrestling and began competing in wrestling at Plano East Senior High School in Plano, Texas. As a junior Lawal won a state title in the Greco-Roman category and also finished as a state runner-up. During his senior season Lawal went undefeated and became a state champion after defeating 171 pound favorite Barrett Lidji. Lawal also competed in football, earning All-District honors as a linebacker during his junior season and as a wide receiver in his senior season. Lawal also lettered in track and field.

Lawal went on to compete in NCAA Division II wrestling at the University of Central Oklahoma. He finished in 2nd place in the nation in 2001 and was a national champion in 2002. For his senior year Lawal moved on to Division I at Oklahoma State University. Lawal became a Big 12 Conference Champion and Division I All-American in 2003 for Oklahoma State, where he finished in third place for the 197 pound division. Lawal was also the university freestyle national champion at 185 pounds that year. After college Lawal continued his wrestling career at the senior level. He also 
competed in the newly formed Real Pro Wrestling league and became the champion of the 184 pound weight class in 2004.

He won the Senior U.S. national championship in freestyle wrestling three times - in 2005, 2006 and 2008. He also represented the U.S. at the 2005 World Wrestling Championships, where he finished in 7th place. He controversially lost his match to Sazhid Sazhidov of Russia when he was penalized a point for passivity with 1 second remaining in a match he was winning, giving Sazhidov the win. Revaz Mindorashvili would be the gold medalist at these games, a wrestler Lawal has defeated.

For over three years, Lawal was the number one ranked wrestler in the United States in the 84 kilogram division. After narrowly missing entrance to the 2008 Olympics in a loss to Andy Hrovat, for which he was favored a spot, Lawal decided to enter the world of mixed martial arts.

Mixed martial arts career

World Victory Road
In his 2008 mixed martial arts debut at Sengoku 5, Lawal fought Travis Wiuff, a veteran of 66 fights at the time, knocking him out in the first round.

At Sengoku 6, Lawal fought Fábio Silva on November 1, 2008, defeating him in the third round via strikes.

On January 4, 2009 Lawal faced Yukiya Naito at World Victory Road Presents: Sengoku no Ran 2009, defeating him in the first round with punches.

On March 20, 2009 at Sengoku 7, Lawal defeated Ryo Kawamura by unanimous decision. His first time going the distance, Lawal attributed his performance to a knee injury sustained about a week before the fight, "I kinda tweaked it rolling around [with Dean Lister], and I tried to rehab it as much as I could before the fight."

M-1 Global
On August 28, 2009 Lawal fought for the first time on U.S. soil against Mark Kerr at M-1 Global Presents Breakthrough. Lawal defeated Kerr by technical knockout 25 seconds into the fight.

Strikeforce
On October 13, 2009, it was announced that Lawal had signed a multi-fight contract with U.S. based promotion Strikeforce. The contract allowed him to continue fighting in the Japanese circuit where he has gained his notoriety.

On December 19 at Strikeforce: Evolution Lawal fought Mike Whitehead, defeating him three minutes and eight seconds into round one via KO (punches). Lawal came in showing relaxed hands and strong counter punching and caught Whitehead with a strong right which dropped him. Lawal followed up with three punches causing the referee to stop the fight.

On April 17, 2010, Lawal defeated Gegard Mousasi by unanimous decision to win the Strikeforce Light Heavyweight Championship.

Lawal lost the Strikeforce Light Heavyweight Championship in Houston Texas, on August 21, against Rafael Cavalcante by TKO due to punches and elbows of 1:14 of round 3.

Lawal was out of action until mid-2011 after undergoing surgery to repair a knee injury.

Lawal was scheduled to fight Roger Gracie at Strikeforce: Fedor vs. Henderson on July 30, 2011. Gracie, however, withdrew from the bout in late June due to an injury. The fight was rescheduled for Strikeforce World Grand Prix: Barnett vs. Kharitonov on Sept. 10, 2011, and Lawal won via KO in the first round.

Lawal garnered his second straight victory, defeating previously unbeaten Lorenz Larkin at Strikeforce: Rockhold vs. Jardine via second-round KO. However, Lawal tested positive for anabolic steroids (Drostanolone) and as a result of the banned substance, the fight's result has been changed to a no contest while Lawal will have his license suspended for one year. After meeting with the Nevada State Athletic Commission on March 27, 2012 his suspension was reduced to nine months.

Lawal was released from Strikeforce following comments he made on Twitter regarding Pat Lundvall after his hearing for his drug test. Lawal said, "She asked if I did research for my training. I didn't get what she meant by the question, and she rolled her eyes and asked, 'Do you speak English? Can you read?' I felt I was disrespected by the woman's comments. How are you going to ask a college educated, well traveled man if he can speak or read English? I'm speaking English right in front of you and I've been speaking English right in front of you for the past 15 minutes."
After the release, Lawal issued an apology to Lundvall, stating, "I was out of line for calling the woman the b-word and I was wrong for that. I was kind of mad about the comments, I was offended by the comments made towards me and I was out of line. I was too emotional. I apologize for that. With that being said, I still feel that I was offended, but I'm in the wrong for what I said."

Bellator MMA
On May 10, 2012, it was reported that Lawal had signed a contract with the mixed martial arts promotion Bellator Fighting Championships.

On January 24, 2013, Lawal made his Bellator debut as a participant in the Season 8 light heavyweight tournament. He defeated Przemyslaw Mysiala in the quarterfinal round via right hook. Lawal faced Emanuel Newton in the semifinals on February 21, 2013 at Bellator 90. Despite being a considerable favorite, Lawal lost via KO due to a spinning back fist in the first round.

Lawal faced Seth Petruzelli in the opening round of a 4-man tournament at Bellator 96 on June 19, 2013, he won the fight by KO due to a punch in full guard at 1:35 of the first round.

Lawal next faced Jacob Noe at Bellator 97 in the light heavyweight tournament final. He won via TKO due to punches in round three to win the Bellator 2013 Summer Series light heavyweight tournament.

Lawal faced Emanuel Newton in a rematch for the Interim Bellator Light Heavyweight Championship on November 2, 2013 at Bellator 106. Lawal lost via unanimous decision.

Lawal entered into the Bellator season ten light heavyweight tournament on February 28, 2014. He faced Mikhail Zayats in the semifinals at Bellator 110 and won the fight via unanimous decision. He faced Quinton Jackson in the tournament final for a title shot. He lost the fight via controversial unanimous decision.

Muhammed Lawal was scheduled to fight Tom DeBlass on September 5, 2014 at Bellator 123; however, Tom DeBlass suffered a knee injury and was forced off the card. Lawal was expected to fight replacement Marcus Sursa at Bellator 123; however instead faced Dustin Jacoby. Lawal won the fight via TKO in the second round.

Lawal was again expected to face Tom DeBlass on November 15, 2014 at Bellator 131. However, on November 1, it was announced that Deblass had suffered a cut during training and had to withdraw from the bout. Lawal eventually faced Joe Vedepo. He won via TKO due to punches in the third round.

Lawal faced Cheick Kongo in a heavyweight bout on February 27, 2015 at Bellator 134. He won the fight by split decision.

Lawal was next a participant in Bellator's one-night light heavyweight tournament at Bellator MMA & Glory: Dynamite 1 on September 19, 2015. He faced Linton Vassell in the opening round and won by unanimous decision. However, Lawal was unable to advance to the finals due to a rib injury.

Lawal faced Phil Davis at Bellator 154 on May 14, 2016. The bout was to determine the next challenger for champion Liam McGeary. He lost the fight by unanimous decision.

Lawal faced Satoshi Ishii at Bellator 169 on December 16, 2016. He won the fight via unanimous decision.

Lawal faced Quinton Jackson in a rematch at Bellator 175 on March 31, 2017. He won the fight via unanimous decision, thus avenging his previous loss to Jackson. Post-fight, it was announced Lawal would face Ryan Bader at Bellator 180. However, Lawal pulled out of the bout in April and was replaced by Phil Davis.

Lawal was expected to face Liam McGeary at Bellator 185 on October 20, 2017. However, he pulled out of the bout on October 2 due to an undisclosed injury.

Lawal faced Ryan Bader in the Bellator Heavyweight Grand Prix for the Bellator Heavyweight championship at Bellator 199 on May 12, 2018. He lost the fight via TKO just 15 seconds into the first round.

Lawal faced former Bellator Light Heavyweight World Champion Liam McGeary at Bellator 213 on December 15, 2018. He lost the fight via TKO in the third round.

RIZIN Fighting Federation Tournament
On November 6, 2015, RIZIN Fighting Federation announced that Lawal would represent Bellator in 8-man tourney at New Year's Eve Rizin card in Japan. His first opponent was initially supposed to be BAMMA heavyweight champ Mark Godbeer, but he eventually faced Brett McDermott. Lawal won the fight via knockout in the first round. He faced Teodoras Aukstuolis in the semi-final round on December 31, 2015 and won via unanimous decision after two rounds. In the tournament finals, Lawal faced Jiří Procházka and won the fight via knockout in the first round.

On December 29, 2016, Lawal returned to Rizin FF as a participant in the Openweight Grand-Prix, replacing an injured Wanderlei Silva in a bout against Mirko Cro Cop. Lawal lost to Cro Cop via TKO in the second round.

Mixed martial arts record

|-
|Loss
|align=center|21–10 (1)
|Andrew Kapel
|KO (punches)
|Bellator 233
|
|align=center|1
|align=center|1:22
|Thackerville, Oklahoma, United States
|
|-
|Loss
|align=center|21–9 (1)
|Jiří Procházka
|TKO (punches)
|Rizin 15
|
|align=center|3
|align=center|3:02
|Yokohama, Japan
|
|-
| Loss
| align=center|21–8 (1)
|Liam McGeary
|TKO (punches)
|Bellator 213
|
|align=center|3
|align=center|0:53
|Honolulu, Hawaii, United States
|
|- 
| Loss
| align=center|21–7 (1)
| Ryan Bader
| TKO (punches)
| Bellator 199
| 
| align=center| 1
| align=center| 0:15
| San Jose, California, United States
| 
|-
| Win
| align=center| 21–6 (1)
| Quinton Jackson
| Decision (unanimous)
| Bellator 175
| 
| align=center| 3
| align=center| 5:00
| Rosemont, Illinois, United States
| 
|-
| Loss
| align=center| 20–6 (1)
| Mirko Cro Cop
| TKO (punches)
| Rizin World Grand Prix 2016: 2nd Round
| 
| align=center| 2
| align=center| 1:41
| Saitama, Japan
| 
|-
| Win
| align=center| 20–5 (1)
| Satoshi Ishii
| Decision (unanimous)
| Bellator 169
| 
| align=center| 3
| align=center| 5:00
| Dublin, Ireland
| 
|-
| Loss
| align=center| 19–5 (1)
| Phil Davis
| Decision (unanimous)
| Bellator 154
| 
| align=center| 3
| align=center| 5:00
| San Jose, California, United States
| 
|-
| Win
| align=center| 19–4 (1)
| Jiří Procházka
| KO (punch)
| rowspan=2|Rizin World Grand Prix 2015: Part 2 - Iza
| rowspan=2|
| align=center| 1
| align=center| 5:09
| rowspan=2|Saitama, Japan
|
|-
| Win
| align=center| 18–4 (1)
| Teodoras Aukstuolis
| Decision (unanimous)
|align=center| 2
|align=center| 5:00
|
|-
| Win
| align=center| 17–4 (1)
| Brett McDermott
| KO (punch)
| Rizin World Grand Prix 2015: Part 1 - Saraba
| 
|align=center| 1
| align=center| 9:20
| Saitama, Japan
|
|-
| Win
| align=center| 16–4 (1)
| Linton Vassell
| Decision (unanimous)
| Bellator 142: Dynamite 1
|
| align=center| 2
| align=center| 5:00
| San Jose, California, United States
| 
|-
| Win
| align=center| 15–4 (1)
| Cheick Kongo
| Decision (split)
| Bellator 134
| 
| align=center| 3
| align=center| 5:00
| Uncasville, Connecticut, United States
| 
|-
| Win
| align=center| 14–4 (1)
| Joe Vedepo
| TKO (punches)
| Bellator 131
| 
| align=center| 3
| align=center| 0:39
| San Diego, California, United States
| 
|-
| Win
| align=center| 13–4 (1)
| Dustin Jacoby
| TKO (punches)
| Bellator 123
| 
| align=center| 2
| align=center| 1:13
| Uncasville, Connecticut, United States
| 
|-
| Loss
| align=center| 12–4 (1)
| Quinton Jackson
| Decision (unanimous)
| Bellator 120
| 
| align=center| 3
| align=center| 5:00
| Southaven, Mississippi, United States
| 
|-
| Win
| align=center| 12–3 (1)
| Mikhail Zayats
| Decision (unanimous)
| Bellator 110
| 
| align=center| 3
| align=center| 5:00
| Uncasville, Connecticut, United States
| 
|-
| Loss
| align=center| 11–3 (1)
| Emanuel Newton 
| Decision (unanimous)
| Bellator 106
| 
| align=center| 5
| align=center| 5:00
| Long Beach, California, United States
| 
|-
| Win
| align=center| 11–2 (1)
| Jacob Noe
| TKO (punches)
| Bellator 97
| 
| align=center| 3
| align=center| 2:51
| Rio Rancho, New Mexico, United States
| 
|-
| Win
| align=center| 10–2 (1)
| Seth Petruzelli
| KO (punch)
| Bellator 96
| 
| align=center| 1 
| align=center| 1:35
| Thackerville, Oklahoma, United States
| 
|-
| Loss
| align=center| 9–2 (1)
| Emanuel Newton 
| KO (spinning back fist)
| Bellator 90
| 
| align=center| 1 
| align=center| 2:35
| West Valley City, Utah, United States
| 
|-
| Win
| align=center| 9–1 (1)
| Przemyslaw Mysiala
| KO (punch)
| Bellator 86
| 
| align=center| 1
| align=center| 3:52
| Thackerville, Oklahoma, United States
| 
|-
| NC
| align=center| 8–1 (1)
| Lorenz Larkin
| NC (overturned)
| Strikeforce: Rockhold vs. Jardine
| 
| align=center| 2
| align=center| 1:32
| Las Vegas, Nevada, United States
| 
|-
| Win
| align=center| 8–1
| Roger Gracie
| KO (punch)
| Strikeforce: Barnett vs. Kharitonov
| 
| align=center| 1
| align=center| 4:37
| Cincinnati, Ohio, United States
| 
|-
| Loss
| align=center| 7–1
| Rafael Cavalcante
| TKO (punches and elbows)
| Strikeforce: Houston
| 
| align=center| 3
| align=center| 1:14
| Houston, Texas, United States
| 
|-
| Win
| align=center| 7–0
| Gegard Mousasi
| Decision (unanimous)
| Strikeforce: Nashville
| 
| align=center| 5
| align=center| 5:00
| Nashville, Tennessee, United States
| 
|-
| Win
| align=center| 6–0
| Mike Whitehead
| KO (punches)
| Strikeforce: Evolution
| 
| align=center| 1
| align=center| 3:08
| San Jose, California, United States
| 
|-
| Win
| align=center| 5–0
| Mark Kerr
| KO (punches)
| M-1 Global: Breakthrough
| 
| align=center| 1
| align=center| 0:25
| Kansas City, Kansas, United States
| 
|-
| Win
| align=center| 4–0
| Ryo Kawamura
| Decision (unanimous)
| World Victory Road Presents: Sengoku 7
| 
| align=center| 3
| align=center| 5:00
| Tokyo, Japan
| 
|-
| Win
| align=center| 3–0
| Yukiya Naito
| TKO (punches)
| World Victory Road Presents: Sengoku no Ran 2009
| 
| align=center| 1
| align=center| 3:54
| Saitama, Japan
| 
|-
| Win
| align=center| 2–0
| Fábio Silva
| TKO (punches)
| World Victory Road Presents: Sengoku 6
| 
| align=center| 3
| align=center| 0:41
| Saitama, Japan
| 
|-
| Win
| align=center| 1–0
| Travis Wiuff
| TKO (punches)
| World Victory Road Presents: Sengoku 5
| 
| align=center| 1
| align=center| 2:11
| Tokyo, Japan
|

World Championship matches

|-
! Res.
! Record
! Opponent
! Score
! Date
! Event
! Location
! Notes
|-
|Loss
|2-1
|align=left|Sazhid Sazhidov
|style="font-size:88%"|1–0, 0–1, 1–1
|style="font-size:88%"|2005-09-26
|style="font-size:88%"|2005 World Wrestling Championships
|style="text-align:left;font-size:88%;"|Budapest, Hungary
|style="text-align:left;font-size:88%;"|
|-
|Win
|2-0
|Ruslan Sumenkov
|style="font-size:88%"|6–0, 1–0
|style="font-size:88%"|2005-09-26
|style="font-size:88%"|2005 World Wrestling Championships
|style="text-align:left;font-size:88%;"|Budapest, Hungary
|style="text-align:left;font-size:88%;"|
|-
|Win
|1-0
|Ibrahim Al Khatib
|style="font-size:88%"|Fall
|style="font-size:88%"|2005-09-26
|style="font-size:88%"|2005 World Wrestling Championships
|style="text-align:left;font-size:88%;"|Budapest, Hungary
|style="text-align:left;font-size:88%;"|
|-

Professional wrestling career

Early career
Lawal was a professional wrestling fan from an early age. Upon graduating from college, Lawal was offered a contract by the professional wrestling promotion World Wrestling Entertainment. Lawal spent a week at Ohio Valley Wrestling, WWE's developmental territory, before ultimately rejecting the contract offer, instead opting to pursue a career in mixed martial arts.

Total Nonstop Action Wrestling (2012–2015)
In May 2012, upon signing with Bellator Fighting Championships, Lawal also signed a separate contract with the professional wrestling promotion Total Nonstop Action Wrestling (TNA), with the intention of simultaneously pursuing careers in mixed martial arts and professional wrestling. Lawal stated that he expected to appear with TNA "two or three times a month or whenever they can book me" and that "if I have a fight coming up, I won't be doing shows or taping". In September 2012, it was reported that Lawal would train as a professional wrestler at Ohio Valley Wrestling, now TNA's developmental territory in Louisville, Kentucky. Lawal made his first appearance in TNA on the October 4, 2012 episode of Impact Wrestling. He went on to serve as a special guest enforcer for a street fight between Bobby Roode and James Storm at the Bound for Glory pay-per-view on October 14, 2012.

King Mo returned to TNA on the July 24, 2014 episode of Impact Wrestling as a heel, attacking Tommy Dreamer, Bully Ray and Devon and aligning with Team Dixie and Dixie Carter. In late 2014, King Mo was removed from Team Dixie due to his absence from TNA.

When asked in February 2015 if he will appear again for TNA, King Mo stated: "I've always been MMA 100%. If they call me I'll make an appearance. Right now, there is nothing going on in wrestling unless they book me to do something." On July 20, 2015, Mo announced his departure from TNA.

Independent circuit (2014, 2019–present)
On June 14, 2014 at House of Hardcore 6, King Mo took part in a special Master Lock challenge from Chris Masters along with other wrestlers in the end, King Mo was able to avoid being to put in The Masterlock and he was able to put Masters in a leg lock submission making Masters tap out.

Return to Impact Wrestling (2017) 
On June 27, 2017, it was announced that King Mo would make his return to Impact Wrestling and be in Lashley's corner for his Impact Wrestling World Heavyweight Championship match at Slammiversary.

Major League Wrestling (2019–present) 
On November 8, 2019, Mo wore an MLW shirt during his entrance to his final fight for Bellator. The following morning it was announced that he had signed an exclusive deal with the promotion and would be making his debut for the promotion at their next TV taping. He won his debut match for the promotion, which aired on their Thanksgiving episode of MLW Fusion via submission. His last match in MLW by now is dated November 10,2021 on the 8th episode of MLW Fusion ALPHA Series.

Personal life
Lawal's parents are immigrants from Nigeria. Lawal was born in Murfreesboro, Tennessee. He has a younger brother named Abdullah and a younger sister named Aminat. The three were raised by a single mother, "My mom (Nike Rouseau) pretty much raised us all. My dad was never around." Muhammed's father committed suicide when Lawal was twenty years old.

After his fight with Larkin, Lawal was diagnosed with Staphylococcus obtained from knee surgery. Lawal had a fever of 103 degrees, and the infection ate away at parts of his hip and legs, "I had this moment where I was like, man, I can see my hip bone. I was ripped still. I had an eight-pack. But there's my hip bone. I looked at my leg, and it looked like those zombies from The Walking Dead. I feel like I looked death in the face, and I survived."

Championships and accomplishments

Mixed martial arts
Bellator MMA
Bellator 2013 Summer Series Light Heavyweight Tournament Championship
Tied (with Liam McGeary) for most knockout wins in Bellator Light Heavyweight division history (5)
Rizin Fighting Federation
Rizin 2015 Heavyweight Grand Prix Championship
Strikeforce
Strikeforce Light Heavyweight Championship (One time)

Amateur wrestling

International Federation of Associated Wrestling Styles
2007 Hargobind International Tournament Senior Freestyle Gold Medalist
2007 Alexander Medved International Senior Freestyle Silver Medalist
2007 Pan American Championships Senior Freestyle Gold Medalist
2007 World Cup Senior Freestyle Silver Medalist
2007 Takhti Cup Senior Freestyle Gold Medalist
2006 Golden Grand Prix Senior Freestyle Bronze Medalist
2006 Uzbekistan Independence Cup Golden Grand Prix Senior Freestyle Gold Medalist
2006 Yasar Dogu International Senior Freestyle Gold Medalist
2006 Dave Schultz Memorial International Open Senior Freestyle Gold Medalist
2005 Dave Schultz Memorial International Open Senior Freestyle Silver Medalist
2004 Clan International Championships Senior Freestyle Silver Medalist
2004 Dave Schultz Memorial International Open Senior Freestyle Bronze Medalist
2004 FILA Manitoba Open Senior Freestyle Silver Medalist
2003 Sunkist Kids International Open Senior Freestyle Bronze Medalist
USA Wrestling
USA Senior Freestyle National Championship (2005, 2006, 2008)
USA University Freestyle National Championship (2003)
2006 NYAC Christmas Championships Senior Freestyle Gold Medalist
2005 FILA World Team Trials Senior Freestyle Winner
2004 NYAC Christmas Championships Senior Freestyle Silver Medalist
National Collegiate Athletic Association
NCAA Division I All-American (2003)
Big 12 Conference Championship (2003)
NCAA Division II Collegiate Championship (2002)
NCAA Division II All-American (2001, 2002)
University Interscholastic League
UIL High School Texas State Championship (1999)
UIL High School All-State (1997, 1998, 1999)

Wrestling
Real Pro Wrestling
RPW Season One 184 lb Championship

Professional wrestling
Vendetta Pro Wrestling
Vendetty Award: 2015 Vendetta Pro Match of the Year (as Special Guest Enforcer)

See also
List of male mixed martial artists
List of current Bellator fighters

References

External links

Official Bellator profile
MiddleEasy.com Interview
Muhammed Lawal profile at the National Wrestling Hall of Fame

1981 births
Living people
People from Murfreesboro, Tennessee
American male mixed martial artists
African-American Muslims
Light heavyweight mixed martial artists
Heavyweight mixed martial artists
Mixed martial artists utilizing collegiate wrestling
Mixed martial artists utilizing freestyle wrestling
African-American mixed martial artists
Mixed martial artists from Tennessee
Mixed martial artists from Texas
Strikeforce (mixed martial arts) champions
American male sport wrestlers
American people of Yoruba descent
American sportspeople of Nigerian descent
American sportspeople in doping cases
University of Central Oklahoma alumni
Central Oklahoma Bronchos wrestlers
Oklahoma State Cowboys wrestlers
American male professional wrestlers
Yoruba sportspeople
Doping cases in mixed martial arts
21st-century African-American sportspeople
20th-century African-American people